This article contains a complete list of Michelin 3-star restaurants in the United States.   Michelin stars are a rating system used by the red Michelin Guide to grade restaurants on their quality. The guide was originally developed in 1900 to show French drivers where local amenities such as restaurants and mechanics were. The rating system was first introduced in 1926 as a single star, with the second and third stars introduced in 1933. According to the Guide, one star signifies "a very good restaurant", two stars are "excellent cooking that is worth a detour", and three stars mean "exceptional cuisine that is worth a special journey". The listing of starred restaurants is updated once per year.

The Michelin Guide began reviewing restaurants in the United States in 2005 beginning with New York City.  In subsequent years, Michelin expanded it's reviews to other major US cities.

As of the 2022 Michelin Guide, there are 14 restaurants in the US with a rating of 3 Michelin stars.

List of Michelin 3-star restaurants

See also

 List of Michelin 3-star restaurants
 List of Michelin starred restaurants in Chicago
 List of Michelin starred restaurants in Florida
 List of Michelin starred restaurants in Los Angeles and Southern California
 List of Michelin starred restaurants in New York City
 List of Michelin starred restaurants in San Francisco Bay Area
 List of Michelin starred restaurants in Washington, D.C.
 List of Michelin 3-star restaurants in the United Kingdom

Notes

References

External links

Lists of restaurants
American cuisine-related lists